"" or "" ("Rose on the Heath" or "Little Rose of the Field") is a poem by Johann Wolfgang von Goethe, published in 1789. It was written in 1771 during Goethe's stay in Strasbourg when he was in love with Friederike Brion, to whom the poem is addressed. The episode is the inspiration for Franz Lehár's 1928 operetta , which includes a setting of "" by Lehár.

"" tells of a young man who sees a small rose in the swamp and decides to pluck it, despite the rose's warning that she will stick him with her thorn so he will not forget his transgression. Nevertheless, the "wild" boy "breaks" the rose, who must bear the pain with no recourse. The text could be interpreted as the boy overcoming a girl (the rose) by force; she does not consent to this violation but he does not heed her protests. She must suffer the consequences. There is a companion poem by Goethe, "Das Veilchen", in which the man is represented by a violet.

Text 

 
Sah ein Knab' ein Röslein stehn,
Röslein auf der Heiden,
War so jung und morgenschön,
Lief er schnell es nah zu sehn,
Sah's mit vielen Freuden.
Röslein, Röslein, Röslein rot,
Röslein auf der Heiden.

Knabe sprach: "Ich breche dich,
Röslein auf der Heiden."
Röslein sprach: "Ich steche dich,
Dass du ewig denkst an mich,
Und ich will's nicht leiden."
Röslein, Röslein, Röslein rot,
Röslein auf der Heiden.

Und der wilde Knabe brach
's Röslein auf der Heiden;
Röslein wehrte sich und stach,
Half ihr doch kein Weh und Ach,
Musste es eben leiden.
Röslein, Röslein, Röslein rot,
Röslein auf der Heiden.
Literal translation
A boy saw a little rose standing,
Little rose on the heath,
Was so young and morning-pretty,
He ran quickly to see it near,
Saw it with much joy,
Little rose, little rose, little rose red,
Little rose on the heath.

Boy said: "I'll break you,
Little rose on the heath."
Little rose said: "I'll prick you,
That you forever think of me,
And I'll not want to suffer it."
Little rose, little rose, little rose red,
Little rose on the heath.

And the wild boy broke
The little rose on the heath;
Little rose defended herself and pricked,
Saved her though no pain or woe,
Had to suffer it anyway.
Little rose, little rose, little rose red,
Little rose on the heath.
Bowring translation
Once a boy a Rosebud spied,
Heathrose fair and tender,
All array'd in youthful pride,–
Quickly to the spot he hied,
Ravished by her splendour.
Rosebud, rosebud, rosebud red,
Heathrose fair and tender!

Said the boy, "I'll now pick thee,
Heathrose fair and tender!"
Said the rosebud, "I'll prick thee,
So that thou'lt remember me,
Ne'er will I surrender!"
Rosebud, rosebud, rosebud red,
Heathrose fair and tender!

Now the cruel boy must pick
Heathrose fair and tender;
Rosebud did her best to prick,–
Vain 'twas 'gainst her fate to kick–
She must needs surrender.
Rosebud, rosebud, rosebud red,
Heathrose fair and tender!

Settings

It has been set to music by a number of composers, most notably in 1815 by Franz Schubert as his D. 257. Schubert's setting is partially based on Pamina's and Papageno's duet "" from the end of act 1 of Mozart's The Magic Flute. The 1829 setting by Heinrich Werner (below) became a popular folk song.

References

External links 

, Peter Schreier, Rudolf Buchbinder

Poetry by Johann Wolfgang von Goethe
Lieder composed by Franz Schubert
1771 poems
1815 songs
Musical settings of poems by Johann Wolfgang von Goethe
Volkslied